Andrew Griffiths is an Australian small business author who has written 13 books – 11 business books published by Allen & Unwin,  one self-help book published by Simon & Schuster and one co-written with magazine publisher Bree James and published by Michael Hanrahan Publishing. His books are sold in over 50 countries and translated into Hindi, Chinese, Vietnamese, Indonesian and Russian.

Career 

His first book, 101 Ways to Market Your Business, was published on 10 October 2000 by Allen & Unwin. He wrote a total of seven books in the 101 Ways business building series and co-authored Secrets of Marketing Experts Exposed.
He is also a motivational speaker and presenter.
In 2011, he was invited to be a keynote speaker at the Million Dollar Round Table Conference in California and was part of Virgin founder Sir Richard Branson’s speaking club at the Financial Education Summit in Melbourne, also in 2011. He is also an international publishing mentor for the entrepreneurial program Key Person of Influence, which operates in the UK, US, Australia and Singapore.
In 2015, he was a presenter at the TEDx conference in Townsville, entitled "Imagine if we were 33% less angry".
Andrew is also the author of hundreds of business articles for New York’s INC.com and entrepreneurial editorials for Flying Solo and is co-author and co-presenter of the Business Over Breakfast podcast show.

Early life 

Griffiths and his sister Wendy were abandoned by their parents when he was six months old and she was 18 months. They were left with their mother’s 74-year-old neighbour, who abused them before welfare officers rescued them.
Due to his unusual childhood, he does not have a birth certificate, but believes he was born in early 1966.

Personal life 
Griffiths lives in Hobart, Tasmania.

Bibliography 

 101 Ways to Market Your Business (October 2000), Allen & Unwin, 
 101 Ways to Boost your Business (March 2002), Allen & Unwin, 
 101 Ways to Really Satisfy Your Customers (October 2002), Allen & Unwin, 
 101 Ways to Advertise Your Business (April 2004), Allen & Unwin, 
 101 Ways to Have a Business and a Life (June 2007), Allen & Unwin, 
 101 Secrets to Building a Winning Business (August 2008), Allen & Unwin, 
 101 Secrets to Build a Successful Network Marketing Business (April 2008), Allen & Unwin, 
 101 Ways to Sell More of Anything to Anyone (May 2009), Allen & Unwin, 
 Bulletproof Your Business NOW(August 2009), Allen & Unwin, 
 The ME MYTH (September 2009), Simon & Schuster 
 The Big Book of Small Business (August 2011), Allen & Unwin, 
 Business over Breakfast (July 2017), MH Publishing, 
 Someone has to be the most expensive, why not make it you? (October 2020), Publish Central,

References

External links 

TEDx https://www.youtube.com/watch?v=BegosarfWsI
Authorville. https://authorville.com.au/
Smallville   https://smallville.com.au/ 

Living people
Australian non-fiction writers
Year of birth missing (living people)